The Certificate of Professional Competence for Transport Managers Qualification is essential for those seeking a career in transport management. The Transport Manager CPC is an Ofqual Regulated Level 3 Qualification and is the minimum qualification required for holding an Operator's Licence. This qualification requires you to pass examinations, and covers both National and International operations.

Level 3 Certificate of Professional Competence for Transport Managers (Passenger Transport) 

Level 3 Certificate of Professional Competence for Transport Managers (Road Haulage) 

Awarding Bodies who provide the Qualifications are:

     The Chartered Institute of Logistics and Transport (CILT(UK))

     City & Guilds

     Skills & Education Group (SEG Awards)

OCR announced their withdrawal as an Awarding Body for the TMCPC Qualifications in December 2021

This qualification is offered on behalf of the Department for Transport. You will find it suitable if you wish to enter the profession of Transport Management or demonstrate your professional competence to meet the Operator Licensing requirements. The qualification includes a range of subjects related to the business of Transport Management. The areas specified in EU Directive 98/76/EC are assessed.  Your qualification will be assessed passing two papers, a multiple choice paper and a case study paper.

References

External links
https://www.gov.uk/become-transport-manager/qualifying-as-a-transport-manager

https://www.gov.uk/government/publications/traffic-commissioners-transport-managers-november-2018/statutory-document-3-transport-managers

Professional titles and certifications